Al-Gharbi is a sub-district located in the Shar'ab ar-Rawnah District, Taiz Governorate, Yemen. Al-Gharbi had a population of 9,408 according to the 2004 census.
´

See also
 Gharb al-Andalus

References

Sub-districts in Shar'ab ar-Rawnah District